Mollahacılı (also, Mollagadzhyly) is a village in the Goychay Rayon of Azerbaijan. The village forms part of the municipality of Qızılağac.

References 

Populated places in Goychay District